is a Japanese boxing manga series written and illustrated by George Morikawa. It has been serialized by Kodansha in Weekly Shōnen Magazine since 1989 and collected in 136 tankōbon to date. It follows the story of high school student Makunouchi Ippo, as he begins his career in boxing and over time obtains many titles and defeats various opponents.



Volume list

Chapters not yet in tankōbon format
These chapters have yet to be published in a tankōbon volume. They were originally serialized in Weekly Shōnen Magazine from August 2022 to March 2023.

Round 1406: 
Round 1407: 
Round 1408: 
Round 1409: 
Round 1410: 
Round 1411: 
Round 1412: 
Round 1413: 
Round 1414:

References

Hajime no Ippo volumes (121-current)